The men's long jump event at the 1972 Summer Olympics in Munich was held on 8 & 9 of September. Thirty-six athletes from 25 nations competed. The maximum number of athletes per nation had been set at 3 since the 1930 Olympic Congress. The event was won by Randy Williams of the United States, the nation's second consecutive and 15th overall gold medal in the men's long jump. Hans Baumgartner earned West Germany's first medal in the event (Germany had taken silver in 1936).

Background

This was the 17th appearance of the event, which is one of 12 athletics events to have been held at every Summer Olympics. The returning finalists from the 1968 Games were fourth-place finisher (and 1960 and 1964 bronze medalist) Igor Ter-Ovanesyan of the Soviet Union, seventh-place finisher Jack Pani of France (who did not start this time), ninth-place finisher (and 1964 gold medalist) Lynn Davies of Great Britain, eleventh-place finisher Leonid Barkovskyy of the Soviet Union, and thirteenth-place finisher (and 1964 finalist) Michael Ahey of Ghana. The favorite was Arnie Robinson of the United States.

Bolivia, Cuba, Saudi Arabia, and Togo each made their first appearance in the event. The United States appeared for the 17th time, the only nation to have long jumpers at each of the Games thus far.

Competition format

The 1972 competition used the two-round format with divided final introduced in 1952. The qualifying round gave each competitor three jumps to achieve a distance of 7.80 metres; if fewer than 12 men did so, the top 12 (including all those tied) would advance. The final provided each jumper with three jumps; the top eight jumpers received an additional three jumps for a total of six, with the best to count (qualifying round jumps were not considered for the final).

Records

Prior to this competition, the existing world and Olympic records were as follows.

No new world or Olympic records were set during the competition.

Schedule

Qualifying and the final were held on separate days for the first time since 1920.

All times are Central European Time (UTC+1)

Results

Qualifying

All jumpers reaching , shown in blue and the top 12 including ties, shown in green, advanced to the final round.

Final

References

External links
Official report

Men's long jump
Long jump at the Olympics
Men's events at the 1972 Summer Olympics